The Atlantis Condominium is a landmark 20-story luxury condominium building in Miami, Florida. It was built between 1980–1982, and was designed by the architectural firm Arquitectonica. The building is known for its glass facade and primary color scheme and the 5-story palm court which is cut out of the building. The palm court features a red spiral staircase, a jacuzzi, and a palm tree. The Atlantis's claim to fame was when it was featured on the opening credits of the television series "Miami Vice," and being used as an exterior filming set in two episodes. The building has 96 units and is located at 2025 Brickell Avenue. This building is an icon to the Miami skyline. On April 18, 2012, the AIA's Florida Chapter placed Atlantis on its list of Florida Architecture: 100 Years. 100 Places.

Popular culture
 Featured in the opening credits of Miami Vice, the building achieved national fame where it was featured as a set.
 It was also featured briefly in Scarface for exterior shots of where Frank Lopez (Robert Loggia) lived (interior shots were done elsewhere).
 It was also featured on the Telemundo soap opera, "Marielena", which starred Lucía Méndez and Eduardo Yáñez.
 A building with a square cut in it is present in a fictional Vice City in the video game Grand Theft Auto: Vice City, which bears clear reference to the Atlantis Condominium.

References

External links
 Emporis's entry on the Atlantis Condominium

Residential buildings completed in 1982
Residential skyscrapers in Miami
Residential condominiums in the United States
1982 establishments in Florida
Arquitectonica buildings